The 66th parallel north is a circle of latitude that is 66 degrees north of the Earth's equatorial plane, about 61 km south of the Arctic Circle. It crosses the Atlantic Ocean, Europe, Asia and North America.

This latitude also roughly corresponds to the minimum latitude in which midnight sun can last all night near the summer solstice.

At this latitude the sun is visible for 24 hours, 0 minutes during the summer solstice and 2 hours, 47 minutes during the winter solstice.

Around the world
Starting at the Prime Meridian and heading eastwards, the parallel 66° north passes through:

{| class="wikitable plainrowheaders"
! scope="col" width="125" | Co-ordinates
! scope="col" | Country, territory or ocean
! scope="col" | Notes
|-
| style="background:#b0e0e6;" | 
! scope="row" style="background:#b0e0e6;" rowspan="2" | Atlantic Ocean
| style="background:#b0e0e6;" | Norwegian Sea
|-
| style="background:#b0e0e6;" | 
| style="background:#b0e0e6;" | Gåsværfjorden, Norwegian Sea
|-
| 
! scope="row" | 
| Skerries of Steinan, Nordland
|-
| style="background:#b0e0e6;" | 
! scope="row" style="background:#b0e0e6;" | Atlantic Ocean
| style="background:#b0e0e6;" | Oddfjorden, Norwegian Sea
|-
| 
! scope="row" | 
| Islands and skerries of Vardøya and Ytre Øksningan, Nordland
|-
| style="background:#b0e0e6;" | 
! scope="row" style="background:#b0e0e6;" | Atlantic Ocean
| style="background:#b0e0e6;" | Øksningssundet, Norwegian Sea
|-
| 
! scope="row" | 
| Hestøya, Nordland
|-
| style="background:#b0e0e6;" | 
! scope="row" style="background:#b0e0e6;" | Atlantic Ocean
| style="background:#b0e0e6;" | Hestøysundet, Norwegian Sea
|-
| 
! scope="row" | 
| Nord-Herøy, Nordland
|-
| style="background:#b0e0e6;" | 
! scope="row" style="background:#b0e0e6;" | Atlantic Ocean
| style="background:#b0e0e6;" | Gautholet, Norwegian Sea
|-
| 
! scope="row" | 
| Hjartøya, Nordland
|-
| style="background:#b0e0e6;" | 
! scope="row" style="background:#b0e0e6;" | Atlantic Ocean
| style="background:#b0e0e6;" | Alstenfjorden, Norwegian Sea
|-
| 
! scope="row" | 
| Alsta, Nordland
|-
| style="background:#b0e0e6;" | 
! scope="row" style="background:#b0e0e6;" | Atlantic Ocean
| style="background:#b0e0e6;" | Leirfjorden, Norwegian Sea
|-
| 
! scope="row" | 
| Alsta, Nordland
|-
| style="background:#b0e0e6;" | 
! scope="row" style="background:#b0e0e6;" | Atlantic Ocean
| style="background:#b0e0e6;" | Vefsnfjorden, Norwegian Sea
|-
| 
! scope="row" | 
| Mainland Nordland
|-
| 
! scope="row" | 
|
|-
| 
! scope="row" | 
|
|-
| 
! scope="row" | 
|
|-
| style="background:#b0e0e6;" | 
! scope="row" style="background:#b0e0e6;" | Arctic Ocean
| style="background:#b0e0e6;" | White Sea, Barents Sea
|-
| 
! scope="row" | 
|
|-
| style="background:#b0e0e6;" | 
! scope="row" style="background:#b0e0e6;" | Pacific Ocean
| style="background:#b0e0e6;" | Gulf of Anadyr, Bering Sea
|-
| 
! scope="row" | 
| Chukchi Peninsula
|-
| style="background:#b0e0e6;" | 
! scope="row" style="background:#b0e0e6;" | Pacific Ocean
| style="background:#b0e0e6;" | Bering Strait
|-
| 
! scope="row" | 
| Alaska 
|-
| 
! scope="row" | 
| Yukon Northwest Territories - for about 16 km Yukon - for about 16 km Northwest Territories - for about 9 km Yukon - for about 8 km Northwest Territories - passing through Great Bear Lake Nunavut
|-
| style="background:#b0e0e6;" | 
! scope="row" style="background:#b0e0e6;" | Arctic Ocean
| style="background:#b0e0e6;" | Roes Welcome Sound, Hudson Bay
|-
| 
! scope="row" | 
| Nunavut - White Island
|-
| style="background:#b0e0e6;" | 
! scope="row" style="background:#b0e0e6;" | Arctic Ocean
| style="background:#b0e0e6;" | Frozen Strait
|-
| 
! scope="row" | 
| Nunavut - Vansittart Island
|-
| style="background:#b0e0e6;" | 
! scope="row" style="background:#b0e0e6;" | Arctic Ocean
| style="background:#b0e0e6;" | Foxe Basin
|-
| 
! scope="row" | 
| Nunavut - Nunaariatjuaq Island
|-
| style="background:#b0e0e6;" | 
! scope="row" style="background:#b0e0e6;" | Arctic Ocean
| style="background:#b0e0e6;" | Foxe Basin
|-
| 
! scope="row" | 
| Nunavut - Baffin Island
|-
| style="background:#b0e0e6;" | 
! scope="row" style="background:#b0e0e6;" | Arctic Ocean
| style="background:#b0e0e6;" | Cumberland Sound, Labrador Sea
|-
| 
! scope="row" | 
| Nunavut - Baffin Island
|-
| style="background:#b0e0e6;" | 
! scope="row" style="background:#b0e0e6;" | Arctic Ocean
| style="background:#b0e0e6;" | Davis Strait
|-
| 
! scope="row" | 
| Serfartooq
|-
| style="background:#b0e0e6;" | 
! scope="row" style="background:#b0e0e6;" | Atlantic Ocean
| style="background:#b0e0e6;" | Sermilik, Denmark Strait
|-
| 
! scope="row" | 
| Moroene
|-
| style="background:#b0e0e6;" | 
! scope="row" style="background:#b0e0e6;" | Atlantic Ocean
| style="background:#b0e0e6;" | Denmark Strait
|-
| 
! scope="row" | 
| Westfjords peninsula
|-
| style="background:#b0e0e6;" | 
! scope="row" style="background:#b0e0e6;" | Atlantic Ocean
| style="background:#b0e0e6;" | Húnaflói
|-
| 
! scope="row" | 
| Skagaströnd town on Skagi peninsula
|-
| style="background:#b0e0e6;" | 
! scope="row" style="background:#b0e0e6;" | Atlantic Ocean
| style="background:#b0e0e6;" | Skagafjörður 
|-
| 
! scope="row" | 
| Tröllaskagi peninsula
|-
| style="background:#b0e0e6;" | 
! scope="row" style="background:#b0e0e6;" | Atlantic Ocean
| style="background:#b0e0e6;" | Eyjafjörður by Dalvík town 
|-
| 
! scope="row" | 
| Flateyjarskagi og Fjörður peninsula
|-
| style="background:#b0e0e6;" | 
! scope="row" style="background:#b0e0e6;" | Atlantic Ocean
| style="background:#b0e0e6;" | Skjálfandi 
|-
| 
! scope="row" | 
| Tjörnes by Húsavík, exiting by Langanes 
|-
| style="background:#b0e0e6;" | 
! scope="row" style="background:#b0e0e6;" | Atlantic Ocean
| style="background:#b0e0e6;" | Greenland Sea Norwegian Sea
|-
|}

See also
65th parallel north
67th parallel north
Arctic Circle

n66